Sail Away may refer to:

Music
 Sail Away (musical), a 1961 musical by Noël Coward, or the title song

Albums
 Sail Away (Great White album) or the title song, 1994
 Sail Away (Randy Newman album), or the title song (see below), 1972
 Sail Away, by Tom Harrell, 1992

Songs
"Sail Away", song written by Noël Coward
 "Sail Away" (David Gray song), 2001
 "Sail Away" (Randy Newman song), 1972
 "Sail Away" (The Rasmus song), 2005
 "Sail Away" (Sam Neely song), 1977; covered by the Oak Ridge Boys, 1979
 "Sail Away" (Urban Cookie Collective song), 1994
 "Sail Away", by Badfinger from Airwaves, 1979
 "Sail Away", by Creedence Clearwater Revival from Mardi Gras, 1972
 "Sail Away", by Deep Purple from Burn, 1974
"Orinoco Flow (Sail Away)", by Enya from Watermark, 1988
 "Sail Away", by Hans Hartz, 1991
 "Sail Away", by John Fogerty from Eye of the Zombie, 1986
 "Sail Away", by Neil Young from Rust Never Sleeps, 1979
 "Sail Away", by Peter Frampton from Somethin's Happening, 1974
 "Sail Away", by Status Quo from Thirsty Work, 1994
 "Sail Away", by Taylor Henderson from Burnt Letters, 2014
 "Sail Away", by the Thirst, 2007

Other uses
 Sail Away (TV series), a 2001 American children's reality series
 Sail Away, a 1995 children's book by Donald Crews

See also 
 "Come Sail Away", a 1977 song by Styx
 "Orinoco Flow (Sail Away)", a 1988 song by Enya